Debra Assembly constituency is an assembly constituency in Paschim Medinipur district in the Indian state of West Bengal.

Overview
As per orders of the Delimitation Commission, No. 229 Debra Assembly constituency is composed of the following: Debra community development block.

Debra Assembly constituency is part of No. 32 Ghatal (Lok Sabha constituency). It was earlier part of Panskura (Lok Sabha constituency).

Election results

2021

2011

 
 

.# Swing calculated on Congress+Trinamool Congress vote percentages taken together in 2006.

1977-2006
Sk. Jahangir Karim of Communist Party of India (Marxist) (CPI(M)) won the Debra assembly seat, five times in a row from 1987 to 2006, defeating Mrigendra Nath Maiti of Trinamool Congress in 2006, Radha Kanta Maiti of Trinamool Congress in 2001  Rabindra Nath Bera of Indian National Congress in 1996, and Sk. Mohammed Daud of Congress in 1991 and 1987. Contests in most years were multi cornered but only winners and runners are being mentioned. Syed Moazzam Hossain of CPI(M) defeated Rabindra Nath Bera of Congress in 1982 and Sukumar Das of Congress in 1977.

1957-1972
Rabindra Nath Bera of Congress won in 1972 and 1971. Bijoy Krishna Samanata won in 1969. K.Chakraborty of Bangla Congress won in 1967. Santosh Kumar Mukherjee of Congress won in 1962. Mohini Mohan Pat of Congress won in 1957.

References

Assembly constituencies of West Bengal
Politics of Paschim Medinipur district